Tabulated below are the medals and overall rankings for host nations in each Summer Olympics and Winter Olympics, based on individual Games medals tables.

Summer Olympics

Winter Olympics

External links 
 The Geopolitics of Winter Olympic Medal Counts, The Atlantic, February 7, 2014
 One Benefit of Hosting the Olympics? More Medals, NPR, August 8, 2012

host